The 1985 ICF Canoe Sprint World Championships were held in Mechelen, Belgium.

The men's competition consisted of six canoe (single paddle, open boat) and nine kayak events. Three events were held for the women, all in kayak.

This was the nineteenth championships in canoe sprint.

Medal summary

Men's

Canoe

Kayak

Women's

Kayak

Medals table

References
ICF medalists for Olympic and World Championships - Part 1: flatwater (now sprint): 1936-2007.
ICF medalists for Olympic and World Championships - Part 2: rest of flatwater (now sprint) and remaining canoeing disciplines: 1936-2007.

Icf Canoe Sprint World Championships, 1985
Icf Canoe Sprint World Championships, 1985
ICF Canoe Sprint World Championships
International sports competitions hosted by Belgium
Canoeing in Belgium